Liotta is an Italian surname that is most prevalent in the region of Sicily.  It is also found among the American, Argentinian, and French Italian diaspora. 

Notable people with the surname include:

 Dennis C. Liotta, American chemist
 Domingo Liotta (1924–2022), Argentine surgeon
 Jay Alan Liotta, United States Department of Defense official
 Jeanne Liotta (born 1960), American visual artist
 Lance Liotta (born 1947), American biologist
 Ray Liotta (1954–2022), American actor, voice actor, and film producer
 Shawn Liotta (born 1980), American indoor football coach
 Silvio Liotta (1935–2018), Italian politician

References 

Italian-language surnames